Matthias Bäcker (born in 1971) is a German oboist and university teacher.

Life and work 
Born  in Schwerin, Bäcker received music lessons at the Conservatory "Johann Wilhelm Hertel" Schwerin and studied with Hans Werner Wätzig at the Hochschule für Musik "Hanns Eisler" in Berlin and with Burkhard Glaetzner at the University of Music and Theatre Leipzig. He also played in the Gustav Mahler Jugendorchester under Claudio Abbado and was a founding member of the Mahler Chamber Orchestra in 1997. He has had permanent engagements as solo oboist with the Berliner Symphoniker, the Nationaltheater Mannheim and from 1999 at the Deutsche Oper Berlin.

Bäcker has played with well-known orchestras such as the Berlin Philharmonic, the Bavarian State Opera, the City of Birmingham Symphony Orchestra and the Camerata Salzburg. As a soloist and chamber musician he has made guest appearances in Germany and abroad. In duet with the pianist Birgitta Wollenweber he performs works by Carl Philipp Emanuel Bach, Benjamin Britten, Robert Schumann, Georg Philipp Telemann, Johannes Brahms, Johann Wenzel Kalliwoda and Florent Schmitt.

Since 2005 Bäcker has been Professor for oboe at the Hochschule für Musik Franz Liszt, Weimar. He is a member of the Senate of the Hochschule.

References

External links 

German classical oboists
1971 births
Living people
People from Schwerin